The following is a summary of Derry county football team's 2007 season. Details of the 2007 Derry club competitions are also shown.

Dr McKenna Cup

Derry were drawn in Section B of the 2007 Dr McKenna Cup alongside Cavan, Tyrone and Queen's University Belfast. Manager Paddy Crozier used the competition as a chance to give inter-county experience to some young promising players, alongside more experienced players. Derry lost to Cavan and Tyrone, before defeating QUB in their final group game.

Derry McKenna Cup line-ups:

Group games

Section B final standings
Source: The Irish News

Pos = Position; Pld = Matches played; W = Matches won; D = Matches drawn; L = Matches lost; F = Scores for; A = Scores against; SD = Score difference; Pts = Points.
2 points are awarded for a win, 1 point for a draw and 0 points for a lost. The three section winners plus best runner up went through to the semi-finals (shaded in green).

National Football League
Derry competed in Division 1B of the 2007 Allianz National Football League.

Group games

Championship

Derry Championship line-ups:

Ulster Senior Football Championship

All-Ireland Senior Football Championship

Club scene
Glenullin won the 2007 Derry Senior Football Championship, the club's first since 1985.

References

External links
Derry GAA official website

Season Derry
Gaelic
Derry county football team seasons